Sebeborci (Prekmurje Slovene: Seböborci) is a village in the Municipality of Moravske Toplice in the Prekmurje region of Slovenia.

References

External links
Sebeborci on Geopedia

Populated places in the Municipality of Moravske Toplice